The 680s decade ran from January 1, 680, to December 31, 689.

Significant people
 Mu'awiya I caliph
 Yazid I
 Mu'awiya II
 Marwan
 Abd al-Malik
 Constans II

References

Sources